Zamolodchikov is a Russian masculine surname, its feminine counterpart is Zamolodchikova. It may refer to
Alexander Zamolodchikov (born 1952), Russian physicist, twin brother of Alexei
Alexei Zamolodchikov (1952–2007), Russian physicist
Elena Zamolodchikova (born 1982), Russian gymnast
Katya Zamolodchikova, stage name of the American drag queen Brian McCook (born 1982)

Russian-language surnames